Catmint usually refers to:
 the genus Anisomeles
 the garden plant Nepeta × faassenii

It may also refer to
 Anisomeles indica
 Anisomeles malabarica, Malabar catmint
 the plant genus Nepeta
 Nepeta cataria, catnip
Nepeta nepetella, lesser catmint

See also
 Catnip (disambiguation)